Following is a list of notable butcher shops:

 Allens of Mayfair, London, U.K.
 Beast and Cleaver, Seattle, Washington, U.S.
 Butchers Shop, Yungaburra, Queensland, Australia
 C Lidgate, London
 Curt's Famous Meats, Independence, Missouri, U.S.
 Galkoff's, Liverpool
 Ginger Pig, London
 Keevil and Keevil, U.K.
 Michael Kirk, U.K.
 Mzoli's, Cape Town, South Africa
 Old Butcher's Shop, Childers
 Jack O'Shea's
 Petrini's
 R J Balson & Son
 Reid's Butcher Shop
 The Shambles
 State Butchers Shop, Roma
 Victor Churchill
 Walkerston State Butcher's Shop

Butcher shops
Lists of retailers